Randall Frakes is a film and science fiction writer primarily known for his work with long-time friends Bill Wisher and James Cameron on The Terminator and Terminator 2: Judgment Day.

While Frakes was in the U.S. Army, he was stationed in Europe, where he edited the newspaper for the 16th Signal Battalion.  While editor, he won a Stars and Stripes award for investigative journalism.

After the Army, he earned a degree in Film Writing and Production from Columbia College, while also writing for Analog, Fantastic, and Fantasy & Science Fiction.

His first film work was as a special effects cameraman for Roger Corman, and a number of unproduced screenplays, before his collaborations with Wisher and Cameron, kicked off his professional film-writing career.

Filmography
 Xenogenesis (1978 short), writer, director, and producer (with James Cameron)
 Battle Beyond the Stars (1980), additional photographer
 Escape from New York (1981), photographic effects
 Galaxy of Terror (1981), photographic effects
 Last Thirty Days of Liberty, unproduced screenplay
 Deathlok, unproduced screenplay
 The Terminator (1984), novelization
 Roller Blade (1986), screenplay
 Aliens (1986), synthesizer effects
 Hell Comes to Frogtown (1987), story, screenplay, and producer
 Roller Blade Warriors: Taken by Force (1989), screenplay (as Lloyd Strathern) and lyrics
 Diplomatic Immunity (1991), screenplay
 Terminator 2: Judgment Day (1991), novelization
 The Divine Enforcer (1992), ghostwriter
 Twisted Fate (1993/II), writer and producer
 The Force (1994), writer
 Titanic: James Cameron's Illustrated Screenplay (1999) author
 Blowback (2000), screenplay
 Sacrifice (2000), written by
 Devil's Prey (2001), writer
 Instinct to Kill (2001), writer
 Stealing Candy (2002), screenplay
 Bad Karma (2002), writer
 Empires of the Deep (2011), screenplay

Books
 #obsession Book by Randall Frakes and Seyedeh Tina Sadri

References

External links
 

American male screenwriters
Living people
Year of birth missing (living people)